Sons of Thunder is the third album by Italian power metal band, Labyrinth. It is a concept album written about King Louis XIV's (also known as 'The Sun King') obsession with a woman named Kathryn. "I Feel You" is an English rendition of the famous Matia Bazar's song "Ti Sento".

Track listing 
"Chapter 1" - 6:02
"Kathryn" - 5:04
"Sons of Thunder" - 5:02
"Elegy" - 4:40
"Behind the Mask" - 4:29
"Touch the Rainbow" - 5:17
"Rage of the King" - 4:55
"Save Me" - 6:10
"Love" - 4:35
"I Feel You" - 4:17

Personnel

Band members
Rob Tyrant – Vocals
Andrew McPauls – Keyboards
Anders Rain – Guitar
Olaf Thorsen – Guitar
Mat Stancioiu – Drums
Chris Breeze - Bass

Production
Neil Kernon - Engineer, Mixing
Alferdo Cappello - Engineer, Remixing
Claudio Giussani - Mastering
Simone Bianchi - Cover concept and painting
Wowe - Photos
Grafica Bisinella - Layout

References

2001 albums
Labyrinth (band) albums
Albums produced by Neil Kernon
Metal Blade Records albums
Concept albums